The United States Senate election of 1948 in Massachusetts was held on November 2, 1948, with Republican incumbent Leverett Saltonstall defeating his challengers.

Republican primary

Candidates
 Leverett Saltonstall, incumbent Senator since 1945

Results
Senator Saltonstall was unopposed for renomination.

Democratic primary

Candidates
 John I. Fitzgerald, former Boston Fire Commissioner and Boston City Councilor
 Francis D. Harrigan, Boston attorney and candidate for Governor in 1946
 Joseph A. Langone, Jr., Boston Election Commissioner and former State Senator
 John D. Lynch, Cambridge City Councilor and former Mayor of Cambridge
 Richard M. Russell, former U.S. Representative and Mayor of Cambridge

Results

General election

Candidates
 Henning A. Blomen, perennial candidate (Socialist Labor)
 John I. Fitzgerald, former Boston Fire Commissioner and Boston City Councilor (Democratic)
 Leverett Saltonstall, incumbent Senator since 1945 (Republican)
 E. Tallmadge Root, candidate for Senator in 1944 and Governor of Massachusetts in 1940 (Prohibition)

Results

See also 
 United States Senate elections, 1948 and 1949

References

Massachusetts
1948
1948 Massachusetts elections